Desmopuntius foerschi is a species of cyprinid endemic to southern Borneo.  This species grows to a length of  SL.

References 

Desmopuntius
Freshwater fish of Indonesia
Fish described in 1982